The City Center-Raipur is a large shopping mall in the city of Raipur the capital of Chhattisgarh State India, which is located near the main Mahalakshmi Cloth Market at Pandri is the hub of the business and entertainment center. The mall has many brand stores like Lee Cooper, Adidas, and Woodland. It also has a five-screen theater. Big Bazaar and Central well equipped for Raipur residents. Mahant Ghasidas Memorial Museum, Raipur

References

External links
 

Buildings and structures under construction in India
Buildings and structures in Raipur, Chhattisgarh
Shopping malls in Chhattisgarh
Year of establishment missing